Phoenicircus is a genus of birds in the family Cotingidae. They have a bright red breast, crown, tail, and rump with the Guianan species having dark brown wings and the black-necked species having black wings. They are frugivores, eating primarily berries and drupes.

Taxonomy
The genus Phoenicircus was introduced in 1832 by the English naturalist William John Swainson. The type species was designated as the Guianan red cotinga by George Robert Gray in 1840. The name combines the Ancient Greek phoinikeos meaning "crimson" or "dark red" with kerkos meaning 
"tail".

The genus contains the following two species:

References

 
Bird genera
Taxonomy articles created by Polbot